Karl Hess: Toward Liberty is a 1980 American short documentary film about the anarchist Karl Hess, directed by Roland Hallé and Peter Ladue. It won an Oscar in 1981 for Documentary Short Subject.

Awards
 1980 – Maya Dern Award, Boston University
 1980 – FOCUS Student Film Festival, Best Film
 1980 – AMPAS Student Film Award, Best Documentary
 1981 – Academy Award for Best Documentary (Short Subject)
 1981 – CINE Golden Eagle
 1981 – Governor's Award, State of Massachusetts

Cast
 Karl Hess as himself (also archive footage)
 Kevin Burns as narrator (voice)
 Barry Goldwater as himself (archive footage)
 Adolf Hitler as himself (archive footage)
 Lyndon Johnson as himself (archive footage) (uncredited)

References

Further reading

External links
 
 , posted by Peter Ladue
 Left-Liberty.net:  Toward Liberty

1980 films
1980 documentary films
1980 short films
1980s short documentary films
American short documentary films
Documentary films about anarchism
Hippie films
Best Documentary Short Subject Academy Award winners
American independent films
1980 independent films
American student films
1980s English-language films
1980s American films